Poèmes pour Mi (Poems for Mi) is a song cycle for dramatic soprano and piano or orchestra by Olivier Messiaen, composed in 1936 and 1937 and dedicated to his first wife, Claire Delbos. The text are poems by the composer based on the New Testament.

History 
Messiaen composed the work at the Lac de Pétichet in the summer of 1936, setting his own poems. Messiaen dedicated the cycle to his first wife, Claire Delbos, a violinist and composer. It is one of three major song cycles, with Harawi and Chants de Terre et de Ciel, and the only one which he also orchestrated, the following year in Paris.

The piano version was premiered on 28 April 1937 as a concert of La Spirale, by Marcelle Bunlet and the composer at the piano. It was published by Édition Durand. The first performance of the orchestra version took place at the salle Gaveau in Paris on 4 June 1937. The soprano Marcelle Bunlet was accompanied by the orchestra of the Société des Concerts du Conservatoire, conducted by Roger Désormière.

Text structure and scoring 
In his poems, Messiaen paraphrases verses from the New Testament in "surrealist poetry". The poems can be seen as depicting first a couple's spiritual struggle, then their journey together. In this work, the rhythmic language uses very irregular durations, and certain processes dear to the author: added values, added points, non-retrogradable rhythms, plus some borrowings from Greek metrics and Hindu rhythmics. The "Mi" syllable of the title is a word of affection, imitating a diminutive, and the nickname of the dedicatee.

 Action de grâces
 Paysage
 La Maison
 Épouvante
 L'épouse
 Ta voix
 Les deux guerriers
 Le collier
 Prière exaucée

The work is scored for soprano solo, four flutes, three oboes (also Cor anglais), two clarinets, three bassoons, four horns, three trumpets, three trombones, tuba, percussion (three players) and strings. The duration is given as 32 minutes.

Recordings 
Both versions of the song cycle have been recorded.
 Piano version: Lise Arseguet, with Messiaen at the piano
 Piano version: Jane Manning, with pianist David Mason (Unicorn-Kanchana)
 Piano version: Maria Oràn, with pianist Yvonne Loriod. (Erato Records, 1988)
 Françoise Pollet, Cleveland Orchestra, conducted by Pierre Boulez, Deutsche Grammophon
 Renée Fleming, Orchestre philharmonique de Radio France, conducted by Alan Gilbert, Decca

References

External links 
 Poèmes pour Mi – Olivier Messiaen, sylviacazeneuve.com
 
 

1937 compositions
Song cycles by Olivier Messiaen
Classical song cycles